Home for Christmas is the thirtieth solo studio album by American singer-songwriter Dolly Parton. It was released on September 11, 1990, by Columbia Records. The album was produced by Gary Smith, with Parton serving as executive producer. It is Parton's second Christmas album, following 1984's Once Upon a Christmas with Kenny Rogers. Unlike Once Upon a Christmas, which featured a number of original songs, Home for Christmas is made up of ten Christmas standards. The album's release was accompanied by an ABC television special, Dolly Parton: Christmas at Home. The album was certified Gold by the RIAA in 1994.

Release and promotion
The album was released September 11, 1990, on CD and cassette. It also received a limited LP release exclusively in the Netherlands.

There were no singles released from the album. Instead, Parton promoted the album's release with a television special titled Dolly Parton: Christmas at Home. It aired December 21, 1990, on ABC. The special features footage of Parton in the studio recording the album, visiting and singing with her family at the Tennessee Mountain Home where she grew up, as well as performances filmed at a church and various other locations in the Smoky Mountains.

Critical reception

Thom Floyd from AllMusic gave the album two out of five stars. He criticized the album's production as "a bit too slick," but said that Parton's "irrepressible charm" makes it a "reasonably enjoyable holiday record."

Commercial performance
The album debuted and peaked at number 74 on the Billboard Top Country Albums chart, spending a total of two weeks on the chart. The album was certified Gold by the RIAA on December 27, 1994.

Track listing

Personnel
Adapted from the album liner notes.

Dolly Parton – lead vocals (all tracks), background vocals (tracks 7, 9)
The Mighty Fine Band:
Michael Davis – keyboards (tracks 1, 3, 6, 10), percussion (track 8)
Richard Dennison – background vocals (tracks 1–3, 5–6, 10)
Jimmy Mattingly – fiddle (tracks 2–4), mandolin (tracks 7–9)
Jennifer O'Brien – background vocals (tracks 1–3, 5–6, 10)
Gary Smith – piano (tracks 1–3, 5–6, 10), Hammond B3 organ (track 5), keyboards (track 6)
Howard Smith – background vocals (tracks 1–3, 5–6, 10)
Steve Turner – drums (tracks 1–3, 5–8, 10), percussion (tracks 2, 4, 8–9)
Paul Uhrig – acoustic bass (tracks 1–2, 7–9), bass (tracks 3, 5–6, 10)
Kent Wells – acoustic guitar (tracks 1–2), electric guitar (tracks 3, 5–7, 10)
Robert Williams – dobro (tracks 4, 8)

Additional musicians
Stuart Duncan – mandolin (track 4), fiddle (track 9)
Carl Jackson – acoustic guitar (all tracks)
Michael Johnson – gut string guitar (track 3)
Jack Smith – steel guitar (tracks 3, 5, 7)
Alisha Jones Wall – Hammond dulcimer (tracks 7–8)

Additional background vocals
Bob Bailey (tracks 5–6)
Bobby Jones & Nashville (tracks 5–6)
Theresa J. Comer, Everett Drake, Nuana Dunlap, Gary E. Jenkins, Bobby Jones, Lenoria Ridley, Lawrence D. Thomison, Harry Watkins, Angela Wright
The Christ Church Pentecostal Choir (track 10)
Jason Beddoe, Coby Coffman, Al Coleman, Melissa Coleman, Joy Gardner, Landy Gardner, Vicki Pointer, Rebekah Rayburn, Tanya Sykes, Mark Warren
Carl Jackson (track 7)
The New Salem Methodist Church Congregation (tracks 1, 10)
Our Kids (tracks 4, 8)
Trent Ashcraft, Alyson Chance, Hannah Dennison, Vanessa Hollowell, Jake Hoover, Crystal Hunt, Amy Johnson, Gretchen Johnson, Cole Kiracofe, Ian Kiracofe, Bryan Seaver, Rebecca Seaver, Austin Smith, Brandon Smith, Tiffany Smith, David Turner, Katie Turner, Derek Wells, Dustin Wells

Production
Michael Davis – recording assistant
Richard Dennison – production assistant
Chrissy Follmar – recording assistant
Brad Jones – recording assistant
Mark Kiracofe – production assistant
John Kunz – recording assistant
The Mighty Fine Band – arrangements
Gary Paczaosa – recording, mixing
Dolly Parton – executive producer
Denny Purcell – mastering
Gary Smith – producer

Other personnel
Dennis Carney – photography
Tony Chase – styling
Rachel Dennison – makeup
Cheryl Riddle – hair

Charts

Certifications

References

1990 Christmas albums
Christmas albums by American artists
Dolly Parton albums
Columbia Records Christmas albums
Country Christmas albums